Raffaello Leonardo (born 1 May 1973 in Naples) is an Italian rower.

References 
 
 

1973 births
Living people
Italian male rowers
Rowers from Naples
Rowers at the 1992 Summer Olympics
Rowers at the 1996 Summer Olympics
Rowers at the 2000 Summer Olympics
Rowers at the 2004 Summer Olympics
Rowers at the 2008 Summer Olympics
Olympic bronze medalists for Italy
Olympic rowers of Italy
Olympic medalists in rowing
Medalists at the 2004 Summer Olympics
World Rowing Championships medalists for Italy
Rowers of Fiamme Oro